Department of Higher Education, Haryana  (Hindi: उच्च शिक्षा विभाग, हरियाणा) is a unit of the Government of Haryana  in India that looks after the College education in the state of Haryana.

History 
In 1966, when Haryana state was carved out of Punjab there arose a need of separate department of Forests. So, in 1966, a separate Department of Higher Education was established for Haryana.

Introduction 
The department is responsible for hiring and employing the Assistant/Associate Professors  for the Government Colleges  of [[Government of Haryana]

See also
  
List of institutions of higher education in Haryana
Rajiv Gandhi Education City, Sonipat
 Department of Elementary Education, Haryana Official website
 Director Secondary Education, Haryana Official website
 Department of School Education, Haryana Official website
 Haryana Board of School Education Official website
 State Counselling Board (SCB), Haryana for admission to the technical courses Official website
 Overseas Placement Assistance Society (OPAS), Haryana 
 Haryana Tourism
 Haryana Roadways

References

External links
HBSE Official Website
Department of Higher Education Haryana Official Website
Government of Haryana Official Website
 Haryana Govt's HarSamadhan Complaints portal

Higher education in India
Education in Haryana
Higher Education
Haryana